Giorgio Grilz (30 July 1930 – 3 December 2018) was an Italian swimmer. He competed in the men's 200 metre breaststroke at the 1952 Summer Olympics.

References

External links
 

1930 births
2018 deaths
Olympic swimmers of Italy
Swimmers at the 1952 Summer Olympics
Sportspeople from Trieste
Italian male breaststroke swimmers